Cyrtodactylus mombergi, also known commonly as the Indawgyi bent-toed gecko, is a species of lizard in the family Gekkonidae. The species is endemic to Myanmar.

Etymology
The specific name, mombergi, is in honor of zoologist Frank Momberg for his work in conservation biology and his support of herpetological research in Myanmar.

Taxonomy
C. mombergi was described as a species new to science in 2019. It was discovered in Indawgyi Lake Wildlife Sanctuary.

Geographic range
C. mombergi is found in northern Myanmar, in Kachin State.

Habitat
The preferred natural habitat of C. mombergi is riverine evergreen forest.

Description

Reproduction
The mode of reproduction of C. mombergi is unknown.

References

Cyrtodactylus
Reptiles described in 2019
Reptiles of Myanmar
Endemic fauna of Myanmar